María Luisa Servín Ortíz (born August 25, 1962) is a retired female long-distance runner from Mexico. She set her personal best in the women's 10,000 metres event (33:13.70) on August 27, 1991 at the World Championships in Tokyo, Japan.

Achievements

References

External links
 

1962 births
Living people
Mexican female long-distance runners
Athletes (track and field) at the 1987 Pan American Games
Athletes (track and field) at the 1991 Pan American Games
Athletes (track and field) at the 1995 Pan American Games
Athletes (track and field) at the 1992 Summer Olympics
Olympic athletes of Mexico
Pan American Games medalists in athletics (track and field)
Pan American Games bronze medalists for Mexico
World Athletics Championships athletes for Mexico
Central American and Caribbean Games silver medalists for Mexico
Competitors at the 1990 Central American and Caribbean Games
Central American and Caribbean Games medalists in athletics
Competitors at the 1987 Summer Universiade
Medalists at the 1991 Pan American Games
20th-century Mexican women